BCPP, an abbreviation for:
 Board Certified Psychiatric Pharmacists
 Botswana Combination Prevention Project
 Brierley Carey Pool Party
 British Columbia Provincial Police
 Prague Stock Exchange, in Czech Burza cenných papírů Praha